Behn may refer to:

People

Surname
 Aphra Behn ( 1640 – 1689), English dramatist
 Ari Behn (1972–2019), Norwegian author and husband to Princess Märtha Louise of Norway
 Friedl Behn-Grund (1906–1989), German cinematographer
 Hernán Behn (died 1933), Puerto Rican businessman; brother of Sosthenes Behn
 Harry Behn (also known as Giles Behn; 1898–1973), U.S. screenwriter and children's author
 Jerry Behn (born 1954), U.S. politician
 Noel Behn (1928?–1998), U.S. novelist, screenwriter, and theatrical producer
 Richard R. Behn (fl. 1978-2007), NOAA rear admiral
 Robin Behn (born 1958), U.S. poet and professor
 Sarla Behn (born Catherine Mary Heilman; 1901–1982), English Gandhian social activist
 Sosthenes Behn (1882–1957), Puerto Rican businessman; brother of Hernan Behn
 Wilhelm Friedrich Georg Behn (1808–1878), German anatomist and zoologist

Given name
 Behn Wilson (born 1958), Canadian ice hockey player

Other
 Behn River, a river of Western Australia
 Behn's bat (Glyphonycteris behnii), a rare South American bat species
 Waldemar Behn, usually called just BEHN, a German alcoholic beverage company

See also
 Benn, a surname and given name

German-language surnames
Surnames from given names